Chen Po-chih (born 1 February 1949) is a Taiwanese politician. He was the Minister of the Council for Economic Planning and Development of the Executive Yuan from 20 May 2000 until 1 February 2002.

References

1949 births
Living people
Academic staff of the National Taiwan University